{{Infobox royalty
| name         = Consort Gongxianxian| title        = Consort Xian (賢妃)
| image        = 
| caption      = 
| birth_name   = 
| birth_date   = 22 November 1391Hongwu 24, 26th day of the 10th month(洪武二十四年十月二十六日)
| birth_place  = Kingdom of Joseon
| death_date   = Yongle 8, 24th day of the 10th month(永樂八年十月二十四日)
| death_place  = Lincheng
| burial_place = Yi County
| spouse       = Yongle Emperor
| posthumous name = 
 Gongxian(恭獻)
 Hyeonin (Xian'ren)(현인; 顯仁)
| house        = Andong Gwon (안동 권씨; 安東 權氏)
| house-type   = Clan
| father       = Gwon Jip-jung (권집중; 權執中)
| mother       = 
}}Consort Gongxianxian (恭獻賢妃 權氏; 26 October 1391 – 20 November 1410), of the Andong Gwon clan, also known as Consort Hyeonin (Xian'ren)' (현인비; 顯仁妃), was a consort of the Yongle Emperor. She was 31 years his junior.

 Titles 
During the reign of the Hongwu Emperor (r. 1368–1398):
Lady Gwon (권씨; 權氏) (from 22 November 1391)
During the reign of the Yongle Emperor (r. 1402–1424):
Consort Xian (賢妃; from February 1409)Consort Gongxianxian (恭獻賢妃; from 1410)Consort Hyeonin'' (현인비; 顯仁妃) (from 1410)

References

1391 births
1410 deaths
Consorts of the Yongle Emperor
Gwon clan of Andong